Vegetia dewitzi is a species of moth in the family Saturniidae. It was described by Peter Maassen and Gustav Weymer in 1886. It is found in South Africa.

References

Endemic moths of South Africa
Moths described in 1886
Dewitzi
Moths of Africa